Judd Books is a new and secondhand bookshop based near King's Cross and Russell Square, London, close to the British Library, that specialises in art and social science books.

Overview 
Judd Books operates across a ground floor and basement with around 50,000 titles available. The ground floor has books covering the arts, architecture, design, film, music, and literature whilst the basement includes ranges across history, philosophy, psychology, politics, economics, sociology, socialism, and other social science focuses.

Judd Books operates online through various online stores such as Amazon, AbeBooks, Bookshop, and Biblio.

Judd Books is a member of the Provincial Booksellers Fair Association.

History 
Judd Books was originally founded within premises on Judd Street, London - hence its name. It opened a new shop on Marchmont Street, London and for a time operated two stores. Eventually the Judd Street store closed and their sole premises remains on Marchmont Street to this day.

In 2008, the Guardian outlined Judd Books as one of "London's finest bookshops".

References 

Bookshops in London
Bookstores established in the 20th century